The Poison Tasters is a 1995 American drama film directed by Ulrik Theer. It was screened in the Un Certain Regard section at the 1995 Cannes Film Festival.

Cast
 Karolina A. Rosinska - Ana
 Tom V. Bierce - Georg
 Veerland Thomas Bierce - Georg
 Barbara Dzido-Lelinska - Landlady
 Marek Kasprzyk - Officer
 Krzysztof Kumor - Professor Mirek
 Ewelina Kuropatwa - Marta
 Aga Lange - Aga
 Maciek Maciejewski - Szymek
 Cezary Pazura - Soldier
 Julitta Sekiewicz-Kisiel - Mrs. Mirek
 French Stewart - Crawford

References

External links

1995 films
1995 drama films
American black-and-white films
American drama films
1990s English-language films
1990s American films